Rory Bromley is a professional rugby league footballer for the Toulouse Olympique team in the Co-operative Championship. He was formerly a player with the Redcliffe Dolphins in the Queensland Cup. His team position is full back.

He ended his first season at the Toulouse Olympique in 2009 as the leading try scorer for the squad with the same number of tries as the centre, Damien Couturier, for 18 matches played (versus 20 for Couturier).

References

External links
Toulouse Olympique profile

1984 births
Living people
Australian rugby league players
Central Queensland Capras players
Redcliffe Dolphins players
Rugby league fullbacks
Toulouse Olympique players